Emily Reed may refer to:

 Emily Reed (singer), British singer 
 Emily Reed, a comic book character, see Dynamo 5#Supporting characters
 Emily Reed (ship), a Down Easter owned by a company in San Francisco
 Emily Wheelock Reed (1910–2000), librarian and civil rights activist